Symmorphus is a primarily holarctic genus of potter wasps.

Species

 Symmorphus albomarginatus
 Symmorphus alkimus
 Symmorphus allobrogus
 Symmorphus ambotretus
 Symmorphus angustatus
 Symmorphus apiciornatus
 Symmorphus aurantiopictus
 Symmorphus bifasciatus
 Symmorphus canadensis
 Symmorphus canlaonicus
 Symmorphus captivus
 Symmorphus carinatus
 Symmorphus cliens
 Symmorphus connexus
 Symmorphus crassicornis
 Symmorphus cristatus
 Symmorphus debilitatus
 Symmorphus decens
 Symmorphus declivis
 Symmorphus foveolatus
 Symmorphus fuscipes
 Symmorphus glasunowi
 Symmorphus gracilis
 Symmorphus hoozanensis
 Symmorphus iwatai
 Symmorphus lucens
 Symmorphus mizuhonis
 Symmorphus momunganensis
 Symmorphus murarius
 Symmorphus negrosensis
 Symmorphus nipteroides
 Symmorphus ornatus
 Symmorphus paralleliventris
 Symmorphus parvilineatus
 Symmorphus projectus
 Symmorphus sichuanensis
 Symmorphus sublaevis
 Symmorphus tsushimanus
 Symmorphus tukvarensis
 Symmorphus violaceipennis
 Symmorphus yananensis
 Symmorphus yunnanensis

Distribution
Many species within this genus are present in most of Europe, in East Palearctic realm, in the Near East and in the Oriental realm. Three species are found in North America.

Description
They nest in pre-existing cavities (twigs, stems, galls, old nests of other Hymenoptera, hollows in the wood). Partitions between cells are made of mud. Adult females prey on caterpillars and larvae of beetles to lay eggs in them.

Bibliography
 Carpenter, J. M. 1986. A synonymic generic checklist of the Eumeninae (Hymenoptera: Vespidae). Psyche, 93: 61–90.

References

External links

Biological pest control wasps
Potter wasps
Hymenoptera genera